The Salisbury University Arboretum, formerly known as the Salisbury State University Arboretum, (50 ha / 125 acres) is an arboretum on the campus of Salisbury University, 1101 Camden Avenue, Salisbury, Maryland.

The collection was begun in 1985. In 1988, the entire university campus was declared an arboretum by the American Association of Botanical Gardens and Arboreta and now contains over 2000 plant species. The arboretum is still under active development with indigenous and exotic plant species added yearly. It is located on the Delmarva Peninsula, an area known as Maryland's Eastern Shore. Midway between the Atlantic Ocean and the Chesapeake Bay, at a latitude of approximately 38 degrees, the climate is suitable for mild-temperate zone plants.

Plant species

Its collection includes: 
 
 Acer griseum
 Acer palmatum
 Acer platanoides
 Acer rubrum
 Acer saccharinum
 Acer saccharum
 Acer triflorum
 Aesculus × carnea
 Aesculus pavia
 Castanea dentata
 Catalpa speciosa
 Cedrus libani
 Cedrus libani var. atlantica
 Cercidiphyllum japonicum
 Cercis canadensis
 Chamaecyparis lawsoniana
 Chionanthus retusus
 Chionanthus virginicus
 Cladrastis lutea
 Clethra barbinervis
 Cornus florida
 Cornus kousa
 Crataegus phaenopyrum
 Cunninghamia lanceolata
 Diospyros virginiana
 Ginkgo biloba
 Gymnocladus dioicus
 Halesia carolina
 Idesia polycarpa
 Ilex opaca
 Koelreuteria paniculata
 Lagerstroemia indica
 Liquidambar styraciflua
 Liriodendron tulipifera
 Magnolia grandiflora
 Magnolia kobus
 Magnolia denudata
 Magnolia × loebneri
 Magnolia macrophylla
 Magnolia salicifolia
 Magnolia × soulangeana
 Magnolia stellata
 Magnolia virginiana
 Malus 'Red Jade'
 Malus × zumi var. calocarpa
 Nyssa sylvatica
 Paulownia tomentosa
 Picea abies
 Picea pungens
 Pinus wallichiana
 Poliothyrsis sinensis
 Prunus mume
 Prunus yedoensis
 Ptelea trifoliata
 Punica granatum
 Pyrus calleryana
 Quercus acutissima
 Quercus phellos
 Quercus rubra
 Sassafras albidum
 Sciadopitys verticillata
 Sorbus rufoferoginnea
 Stuartia pseudocamellia
 Styrax japonicus
 Styrax obassia
 Syringa reticulata
 Taxodium distichum
 Taxodium ascendens
 Tetradium daniellii
 Tilia cordata
 Tsuga canadensis
 Vitex agnus-castus

Sculpture collection
The Arboretum is also notable for its collection of figurative sculpture, notably in the Beaux Arts style. Notable works include:
Diana (1886) by Augustus Saint-Gaudens
Coquelin Cadet (1912) by Auguste Rodin (a study for Burghers of Calais)
Ralph Waldo Emerson (1879) by Daniel Chester French
Harriet Tubman (2009) by Jim Hill
Fallen Angel (1995) by Benson Selzer
The Prodigal Son (1976) by Leonard Baskin
Panther of India (c.1870) by Antoine-Louis Barye
Ishmael (1995) by Bart Walter
Henry David Thoreau (1945) by Jo Davidson
Brotherly Love (1886) by George Grey Barnard

Many of these sculptures can be found in the Link of Nations, connecting the University Commons to the Guerrieri University Center.

See also 
List of botanical gardens in the United States

References

External links
Salisbury University Arboretum

Arboreta in Maryland
Botanical gardens in Maryland
Salisbury University
Salisbury, Maryland
Tourist attractions in Wicomico County, Maryland
Protected areas of Wicomico County, Maryland